is a publishing imprint affiliated with the Japanese publishing company ASCII Media Works. It was established on December 16, 2009 with the publication of eight novels, and is a mainstream novel imprint aimed at a general audience. The imprint is an extension of ASCII Media Works's Dengeki Bunko imprint which publishes light novels. Authors who have moved on from light novels, even ones previously published under Dengeki Bunko, also are published under Media Works Bunko. Winners of the Media Works Bunko Prize in ASCII Media Works' Dengeki Novel Prize annual contest are published on this imprint, along with winning 500,000 yen. The first two winners of the prize in the sixteenth Dengeki Novel Prize held in 2009 were Mado Nozaki, for (Ei) Amrita, and Kaoru Arima, for Taiyō no Akubi.

Published titles

0–9

A

B

C

D

E

F

G

H

I

K

M

O

P

R

S

T

Y

References

External links
Official website 

ASCII Media Works
Book publishing company imprints
 
Publishing companies established in 2009